The 3rd constituency of the Côte-d'Or is a French legislative constituency in the Côte-d'Or département. Like the other 576 French constituencies, it elects one MP using the two-round system.

Description

Côte-d'Or's 3rd constituency is largely urban as it is based around the southern parts of Dijon. It also includes the town of Chenôve, which today forms Dijon's largest suburb.

The seat is the more left leaning of the three constituencies in Côte-d'Or that include parts of Dijon within them.

Historic Representation

Election results

2022 

 
 
|-
| colspan="8" bgcolor="#E9E9E9"|
|-
 
 

 
 
 
 
 

* Richard stood as a PS dissident, without the support of the party or the NUPES alliance.

2017

2012

References

3